Fred Seko Aryee (born 22 July 1939) is a Nigerian former footballer who played as a midfielder. He competed in the men's tournament at the 1968 Summer Olympics.

References

External links
 

1939 births
Living people
Footballers from Accra
Association football midfielders
Nigerian footballers
Nigeria international footballers
Olympic footballers of Nigeria
Footballers at the 1968 Summer Olympics
Stationery Stores F.C. players